South Korea competed  in the 1995 World Championships in Athletics from August 5th to 13th. A team of 6 athletes was announced in preparation for the competition.

Results

Men

References
1995 championship Results. 

World Championships in Athletics
1995
Nations at the 1995 World Championships in Athletics